Rudi Schwamborn, professionally known as Carlprit,  is a German-Zimbabwean rapper, actor, songwriter, and music manager. He has performed and written for acts such as Cascada, Alexandra Stan and Laurent Wolf. Schwamborn is best known for his song "Fiesta" as well as his appearance in Cascada's 2009 hit single "Evacuate the Dancefloor". The title sold over three million copies worldwide and reached the top 20 on Billboard charts, making Carlprit the first person of Zimbabwean origin to have a song on the top U.S. Billboard charts.

Early life
Carlprit was born in Avenues, Harare, to a Zimbabwean mother and a German father. He grew up on Tom Ward Ave. by Cotswold Hills in Mabelreign, Harare. He attended North Park Primary School and Ellis Robins Boys High School before leaving Harare to live with one of his older brothers in Germany. The youngest of five siblings, Carlprit is the younger brother of rapper Metaphysics of Söhne Mannheims.

Music career
Carlprit first started releasing music after moving to Germany. He started off doing Hip hop music but soon switched genre to EDM (Electronic Dance Music) after being offered paying jobs for his vocal performances by German producers.

Carlprit's first major release was on the song "Evacuate the Dancefloor" by Cascada which topped charts internationally. The song went Platinum in the US, and reached number #1 in the UK and the Netherlands.

After that Carlprit began working with pop acts including Mike Candys, Michael Mind Project, Alexandra Stan, Laurent Wolf, Darius & Finlay, Shaun Baker, R.I.O., U-Jean, DJ Manian, Whigfield, Tony T, Yanou, Nicco, ItaloBrothers and Raffaella Fico just to mention a few.

First single
Carlprit's first official solo single "See You At The Top" features the UK brother duo Bkay and Kazz. The song was released independently on Gandanga Records and Pyramid Music and was featured on the hit German television show Model WG and reached first position in South Africa on Channel O's request show.

Zooland Records and Universal Records released Carlprit's second solo single, "1234". The video was directed by Dany Wild and featured Miss Victoria Kern as the female acting vocalist.

"Fiesta" smash hit and solo success
His third solo single, "Fiesta", is widely considered his most successful, reaching number one in the French air play charts, the top 100 in Germany, France and Switzerland's single sales charts and over 5 million YouTube views. Fiesta was produced by The Michael Mind Project and Markus Shultz and features vocals recorded and written by CVB.  The single was signed mainly to Kontor Records (Germany), Scorpio Music (France) and Blanco y Negro Records (Spain) and it also has an exclusive version for NRG radio.

Present
Since then, Carlprit has toured around the world and continues to release music.

Discography

Carlprit solo

Guest appearance

Full discography

Albums
 "Club Bangers " (2023, Carlprit)
 "More Beats To Chill To This Summer " (2022, Carlprit)
 "Beats To Chill To This Summer " (2022, Carlprit)
 "True Stories" (2021, Carlprit)
 "Carlprit Best Of " (2021, Carlprit)
 "Hustlers Academy " (2008, Carlprit)
 "B-Clubed " (2004, Carlprit)

As lead artist
 "Would You Be" (2023, with King Khama)
 "No No" (2023, with Maxim Schunk)
 "Down Town" (2022, with Tony T)
 "Phonk Is My Religion" (2022, with Dirty Fangz)
 "Change My World" (2022, with Edwan & Bloodlyne)
 "Airplane Mode" (2022)
 "Zeemahta" (2022, with Dirty Fangz & Gonzo The Great)
 "All The Way" (2022, with Kindervater & Bloodlyne)
 "Billie Eilish" (2022, with Crystal Rock)
 "Some More" (2022, with Tony-T)
 "Niggers In Paris" (2022, with Mikis & Crystal Rock)
 "Never Be Lonely" (2022, with Relanium, Deen West)
 "Go Crazy" (2022, with Bloodlyne)
 "What Then" (2022, with Calvo & Steve Modana)
 "Go Harder" (2022, with Onary)
 "Ratchet" (2021, with Steve Modana)
 "Chibata" (2021, with Kazz Khalif & Simon Rossi)
 "Benzo" (2021, with Metaphysics)
 "Freaky" (2021, with Chief Capone)
 "Frisky" (2021, with Kazz Khalif & Bailey Browne)
 "Benzo" (2021)
 "Party Don't Stop" (2021, with Thom Colvin)
 "True Stories" (2021)
 "Doggy" (2021, Relanium & Deen West)
 "Diamonds" (2021, Limao & Nicco)
 "Club Banger RMX" (2021, produced by Edwan)
 "Turn This Party On" (2020, feat. Edwan & CVB) 
 "Club Banger" (2019) 
 "All Right" (2019) 
 "Don't Walk Away" (2019, feat. Kazz A.K.A Mr Boomslang) 
 "Your Body" (2019, feat. DJ Jackson & Kazz A.K.A Mr Boomslang) 
 "Number One" (2019, feat. Yoxi)
 "Hello Darling" (2018, feat. Edwan & Kazz A.K.A Mr Boomslang) 
 "My Kind Of Trouble" (2018, feat. Edwan & Kazz aka Mr Boomslang)  
 "So Fresh" (2018)
 "Hold On" (2016)
 "Domino" (2015 feat. U-jean) 
 "Only Gets better" (2014, feat. Jaicko) 
 "Remember to forget" feat. Jaicko 
 "Party Around the World" (2013, feat. CvB) 
 "Allez Allez" (2013, feat. CvB) 
 "Fiesta" (2013, feat. CvB) 
 "1234" (2011, with R.I.O.) 
 "See You At The Top" (2010 feat. B-Kay & Kazz)

Other collaborations
"Until The Baseline Drops" (2023, Plastik Funk and Esox) Vocals only
"Insomnia Rework" (2021, Mike Candys and Jack Holiday) Vocals only
"Shots" (2021, Jakle feat. Carlprit)
"Shadow Crimes Audio Trip RMX" (2020, Heidi Anne feat. Carlprit)
"#Party" (2020, Plastik Funk, Relanium Deen West feat. Carlprit)
"Shadow Crimes" (2020, Heidi Anne feat. Carlprit)
"Besito" (2020, Tom Boxer feat. Carlprit)
"Trouble" (2020, DJ Sanny & DJ Samuel Kimko feat. Carlprit)
"Like the Wind" (2019, Max Grosseck feat. Tony-T & Carlprit)
"Tanz" (2019, Gin Tely feat. Carlprit & D Ocean)
"Boss Sh**" (2018, Corti & LaMedica Andry J feat. Carlprit)
"light Up The Club" (2018, Relanium & Deen West feat. Carlprit) 
"I Want Her" (2017, DJ Seip & Carlprit) 
"Yolo" (2015, Modana & Carlprit) 
"Get Gone" (2014, Luca Dayz feat. Carlprit)
"Brand New Day" (2013, Mike Candys feat. Carlprit)
"Biggest Fan" (2013, Modana & Carlprit) 
"Saturday Night" (2013, Whigfield feat. Carlprit)
"Don't Stop The Dancing" (2012, DJ Manian feat. Carlprit)
"Do It All Night" (2012,  Darius and Finlay feat. Carlprit)
"Club Go Mad" (2012, Modana & Carlprit)
"Hotspot" (2012, Modana & Carlprit) 
"Party Crash" (2012, Modana & Carlprit) 
"Freak Around" (2012,  Dirty Dubs feat. Carlprit) 
"The Night" (2012, HouseTwins feat. Carlprit & Lio) 
"Only Just Begun" (2012, Dimaro feat. Rosette and Carlprit) 
"Elevator" (2012, Irresistible feat. Carlprit) 
"Ready for Tonight" (2012, Dimaro feat. Rosette and Carlprit) 
"Do what you do" (2012, Klass feat. Carlprit) 
"Love Music" (2012, Shaun Baker feat. Carlprit) 
"1.000.000" (2012, with Alexandra Stan) 
"Don't Stop The Music" (2012, Love Unit feat. Carlprit)
"Boom" (2011, ItaloBrothers feat. Carlprit) 
"One More Time" (2011, Body Banger's feat. Carlprit & Linda Teodosiu) 
"Second Beat Is Mine" (Sasha Dith, Daagard & Morane feat. Carlprit) 
"Party On" (2011, Funkybootz feat. Carlprit) 
"Heaven Is a Place" (2011, U-Jean feat. Carlprit)
"Shake That Boo Boo" (2011, Modana & Carlprit) 
"Flip Flops and Hightops" (2011, Dear Zim feat. Carlprit)
"Independence Day" (2011, Cascada & Carlprit)
"Unspoken" (2011, Cascada & Carlprit)
"Dance with Me" (2011, BRYCE feat. Carlprit)
"We Are Here" (2011, Laurent Wolf feat. Carlprit and Mr Lio & Laurent Pepper)
"Delirious" (2010, Michael Mind Project feat. Carlprit and Mandy Ventrice)
"Ghetto Superstar" (2010, Basslovers feat. Carlprit)
"LOVEBEAT" (2010, Amari feat. Carlprit)
"How Do You Sleep" (2010, Angle City feat. Carlprit)
"Boys Boys Boys" (2010, TWiiNS feat. Carlprit) 
"Ya Odna" (2010, Blue Affair & Sasha Dith feat. Carlprit)
"Digi Ben" (2010, Mondotek feat. Carlprit)
"Evacuate The Dancefloor " (2009, Cascada feat. Carlprit)

References

1986 births
Living people
German rappers
People from Harare
Eurodance musicians
Zimbabwean emigrants to Germany
Zimbabwean rappers